Scotocampa is a genus of moths of the family Noctuidae.

Species
 Scotocampa crassipuncta (Püngeler, 1905)
 Scotocampa indigesta Staudinger, 1888
 Scotocampa sheljuzhkoi Gyulai & Ronkay, 2002

References
Natural History Museum Lepidoptera genus database
Scotocampa at funet

Hadeninae